The Windham Senate District is one of 16 districts of the Vermont Senate. The current district plan is included in the redistricting and reapportionment plan developed by the Vermont General Assembly following the 2020 U.S. Census, which applies to legislatures elected in 2022, 2024, 2026, 2028, and 2030.

The Windham District includes all of Windham County except the town of Wilmington.

As of the 2000 census, the state as a whole had a population of 608,827. As there are a total of 30 Senators, there were 20,294 residents per senator.  The Windham District had a population of 41,991 in that same census.  The district is apportioned two senators. This equals 20,996 residents per senator, 3.46% above the state average.

District Senators
2005-2006
Roderick M. Gander, Democrat
Jeanette K. White, Democrat

2007-2008
Peter Shumlin, Democrat
Jeanette K. White, Democrat

As of 2017
Becca Balint, Democrat
Jeanette K. White, Democrat

Towns and cities in the Windham District

Windham County 
Athens
Brattleboro
Brookline
Dover
Dummerston
Grafton
Guilford
Halifax
Jamaica
Londonderry
Marlboro
Newfane
Putney
Rockingham
Somerset
Stratton
Townshend
Vernon
Wardsboro
Westminster
Whitingham
Windham

See also
Members of the Vermont Senate, 2005-2006 session
Vermont Senate Districts, 2002-2012

External links
Map of Vermont Senate districts and statistics (PDF)
Vermont Act 151 (2002), which created the districts.  Note comprehensive act, redistricting section begins on page 67. (PDF)

Vermont Senate districts
Windham County, Vermont